Philip Carteret; ; (1639–1682) was the first Governor of New Jersey, from 1665 to 1673 and governor of East New Jersey from 1674 to 1682.

Career 
The English annexed the Dutch province of New Netherland in 1664, and lands west of Long Island and Manhattan Island were awarded to two Lords Proprietors, John Berkeley and George Carteret (cousin of Philip). In 1665, Carteret (or "Cartaret") was appointed by them to take possession of the newly acquired territory which been renamed the Province of New Caesaria, or New Jersey, and assume the position of governor.

Philip Carteret and Berkeley issued the Concessions and Agreements of the Proprietors of New Jersey, the "most liberal grant of political privileges made by any English colonial proprietor to the people". Freedom of conscience was guaranteed and generous land grants were promised. Carteret indeed issued many grants of lands to settlers and landowners, partly with the purpose of increasing the worth of the colony. The pair "expected to profit from sales of their rich North American land holdings, and they were not disappointed".

Carteret designated Elizabethtown (named after the wife of George Carteret) as the capital of New Jersey, where a representative assembly first met in 1668. Middletown Township and Shrewsbury Township refused to send representatives to this New Jersey Assembly and declared their independence, electing James Carteret as their leader. Carteret became angry and left for England, and had the English government force the New Jersey settlers to pay quitrents.

Carteret found the province inhabited by "a few hundred Dutchmen and English Puritans. During his governorship, more towns sprang up in New Jersey.
By the end of  his term in 1682 the province consisted of seven towns, and many outlying plantations. The populations (exclusive of Lenape natives) was about 3500 in the seven established towns of Berghen, Newarke, Elizabeth Towne, Woodbridge, Piscattawy and Middletown, with an undetermined number in outlying areas.

After the death of George Carteret, Governor Edmund Andros of New York attempted to seize power in East Jersey. When Philip Carteret refused to give up his position as governor, Andros sent a raiding party to his home and had him beaten and arrested to New York. Carteret was placed on trial, but was acquitted by the jury. The attack caused permanent injuries to Carteret, and he died in 1682.

See also
Bergen, New Netherland
List of colonial governors of New Jersey
East Jersey

References
Samuel Eliot Morison: The Oxford History of the American People, Vol. 1: Oxford University Press 1965 & 1972. Library of Congress: 65-12468.
Hugh Brogan: The Longman History of the United States of America: Longman Group Ltd. 1985.
Robert H Ferrell (with Richard Natkiel): Atlas of American History: Bison Books Ltd. 1987.

External links
Decarteret.org.uk, Person Sheet
Colonial History of New Jersey, USAhistory.info

1639 births
1682 deaths
Philip Carteret Governor
Colonial governors of New Jersey
Jersey people
Politicians from Elizabeth, New Jersey
Governors of East New Jersey